Parliamentary elections were held in Panama on 6 August 1972, electing both a new National Assembly of Community Representatives.

No elections were held under the military government until April 1970, when the town of San Miguelito, incorporated as the country's sixty-fourth municipal district, was allowed to elect a mayor, treasurer, and municipal council. Candidates nominated by trade groups and other nonpartisan bodies were elected indirectly by a council that had been elected by neighborhood councils. Subsequently, the new system was extended throughout the country, and in 1972 the National Assembly of Community Representatives met in Panama City to confirm Torrijos's role as head of government and to approve a new constitution. The new document greatly expanded governmental powers at the expense of civil liberties. The state also was empowered to "oversee the rational distribution of land" and, in general, to regulate or initiate economic activities. In a reference to the Canal Zone, the Constitution also declared the ceding of national territory to any foreign country to be illegal.

The old National Assembly associated with the influence of the traditional parties was abolished and replaced with a National Assembly of Community Representatives (Corregimientos). This new Assembly contained 505 members elected from the small subdistricts into which Panama had been divided during colonial times.

The traditional political parties were banned from electoral participation, and short legislative sessions ensured that there would be no time to mount meaningful challenges to military executive authority. 

While the Liberals and Panameñistas boycotted the elections for representatives to the Assembly of Corregimientos, the People’s Party of Panama (PPP) ran 120 candidates. 

Meeting in September the Assembly acclaimed Gen. Torrijos as ‘the Supreme leader of the Panamanian Revolution’.

The 1972 constitution, which created this new ‘popular legislature,’ also recognized the central role within the executive branch of General Torrijos and the defense forces. The impotency of the president within this new constitutional structure was best expressed by the fact that he could neither appoint nor remove military personnel.

Results

National Assembly of Community Representatives

References

Parliament
Elections in Panama
Panama